The Blue Whale was a jazz club located on the top floor of Weller Plaza in downtown Los Angeles. The club was opened in 2009 by jazz vocalist Joon Lee and regularly featured regional and internationally acclaimed jazz artists. It was announced on December 31, 2020 that the club has been permanently closed.

See also
List of jazz clubs

References

External links

Blue Whale, Official Site

Jazz clubs in Los Angeles